Menes (fl. c. 3200–3000 BC; ;  pronounced *) was a pharaoh of the Early Dynastic Period of ancient Egypt credited by classical tradition with having united Upper and Lower Egypt and as the founder of the First Dynasty.

The identity of Menes is the subject of ongoing debate, although mainstream Egyptological consensus identifies Menes with the Naqada III ruler Narmer or First Dynasty pharaoh Hor-Aha. Both pharaohs are credited with the unification of Egypt to different degrees by various authorities.

Name and identity 
The commonly-used name Menes derives from Manetho, an Egyptian historian and priest who lived during the Ptolemaic Kingdom. Manetho noted the name in Greek as Μήνης (transliterated: Mênês). An alternative Greek form, Μιν (transliterated: Min), was cited by the fifth-century-BC historian Herodotus, but this variant is no longer accepted; it appears to have been the result of contamination from the name of the god Min.
By the early New Kingdom, changes in the Egyptian language meant his name was already pronounced . The name mnj means "He who endures", which, I.E.S. Edwards (1971) suggests, may have been coined as "a mere descriptive epithet denoting a semi-legendary hero [...] whose name had been lost". Rather than a particular person, the name may conceal collectively the Naqada III rulers: Ka, Scorpion II and Narmer.

Narmer and Menes 

The almost complete absence of any mention of Menes in the archaeological record and the comparative wealth of evidence of Narmer, a protodynastic figure credited by posterity and in the archaeological record with a firm claim to the unification of Upper and Lower Egypt, has given rise to a theory identifying Menes with Narmer.

The chief archaeological reference to Menes is an ivory label from Naqada which shows the royal Horus-name Aha (the pharaoh Hor-Aha) next to a building, within which is the royal nebty-name mn, generally taken to be Menes. From this, various theories on the nature of the building (a funerary booth or a shrine), the meaning of the word mn (a name or the verb endures) and the relationship between Hor-Aha and Menes (as one person or as successive pharaohs) have arisen.

The Turin and Abydos king lists, generally accepted to be correct, list the nesu-bit-names of the pharaohs, not their Horus-names, and are vital to the potential reconciliation of the various records: the nesu-bit-names of the king lists, the Horus-names of the archaeological record and the number of pharaohs in Dynasty I according to Manetho and other historical sources.

Flinders Petrie first attempted this task, associating Iti with Djer as the third pharaoh of Dynasty I, Teti (Turin) (or another Iti (Abydos)) with Hor-Aha as second pharaoh, and Menes (a nebty-name) with Narmer (a Horus-name) as first pharaoh of Dynasty I. Lloyd (1994) finds this succession "extremely probable", and Cervelló-Autuori (2003) categorically states that "Menes is Narmer and the First Dynasty begins with him".  However, Seidlmayer (2004) states that it is "a fairly safe inference" that Menes was Hor-Aha.

Two documents have been put forward as proof either that Narmer was Menes or alternatively Hor-Aha was Menes. The first is the "Naqada Label" found at the site of Naqada, in the tomb of Queen Neithhotep, often assumed to have been the mother of Horus Aha. The label shows a serekh of Hor-Aha next to an enclosure inside of which are symbols that have been interpreted by some scholars as the name "Menes". The second is the seal impression from Abydos that alternates between a serekh of Narmer and the chessboard symbol, "mn", which is interpreted as an abbreviation of Menes. Arguments have been made with regard to each of these documents in favour of Narmer or Hor-Aha being Menes, but in neither case is the argument conclusive.

The second document, the seal impression from Abydos, shows the serekh of Narmer alternating with the gameboard sign (mn), together with its phonetic complement, the n sign, which is always shown when the full name of Menes is written, again representing the name “Menes”. At first glance, this would seem to be strong evidence that Narmer was Menes. However, based on an analysis of other early First Dynasty seal impressions, which contain the name of one or more princes, the seal impression has been interpreted by other scholars as showing the name of a prince of Narmer named Menes, hence Menes was Narmer's successor, Hor-Aha, and thus Hor-Aha was Menes.

Herodotus, after having mentioned the first king of Egypt, Min, he wrote that Linus, called by the Egyptians Maneros, was "the only son of the first king of Egypt" and that he died untimely.

Dates 
Egyptologists, archaeologists, and scholars from the 19th century have proposed different dates for the era of Menes, or the date of the first dynasty:
 John Gardner Wilkinson (1835) – 2320 BC
 Jean-François Champollion (Published posthumously in 1840) – 5867 BC
 August Böckh (1845) – 5702 BC
 Christian Charles Josias Bunsen (1848) – 3623 BC
 Reginald Stuart Poole (1851) – 2717 BC
 Karl Richard Lepsius (1856) – 3892 BC
 Heinrich Karl Brugsch (1859) – 4455 BC
 Franz Joseph Lauth (1869) – 4157 BC
 Auguste Mariette (1871) – 5004 BC
 James Strong (1878) – 2515 BC
 Flinders Petrie (1887) – 4777 BC

Modern consensus dates the era of Menes or the start of the first dynasty between c. 3200–3030 BC; some academic literature uses c. 3000 BC.

History 

By 500 BC, mythical and exaggerated claims had made Menes a culture hero, and most of what is known of him comes from a much later time.

Ancient tradition ascribed to Menes the honour of having united Upper and Lower Egypt into a single kingdom and becoming the first pharaoh of the First Dynasty. However, his name does not appear on extant pieces of the Royal Annals (Cairo Stone and Palermo Stone), which is a now-fragmentary king's list that was carved onto a stela during the Fifth Dynasty. He typically appears in later sources as the first human ruler of Egypt, directly inheriting the throne from the god Horus. He also appears in other, much later, king's lists, always as the first human pharaoh of Egypt. Menes also appears in demotic novels of the Hellenistic period, demonstrating that, even that late, he was regarded as an important figure.

Menes was seen as a founding figure for much of the history of ancient Egypt, similar to Romulus in ancient Rome. Manetho records that Menes "led the army across the frontier and won great glory".

Capital 
Manetho associates the city of Thinis with the Early Dynastic Period and, in particular, Menes, a "Thinite" or native of Thinis. Herodotus contradicts Manetho in stating that Menes founded the city of Memphis as his capital after diverting the course of the Nile through the construction of a levee. Manetho ascribes the building of Memphis to Menes' son, Athothis, and calls no pharaohs earlier than Third Dynasty "Memphite".

Herodotus and Manetho's stories of the foundation of Memphis are probably later inventions: in 2012 a relief mentioning the visit to Memphis by Iry-Hor—a predynastic ruler of Upper Egypt reigning before Narmer—was discovered in the Sinai Peninsula, indicating that the city was already in existence in the early 32nd century BC.

Cultural influence 

Diodorus Siculus stated that Menes had introduced the worship of the gods and the practice of sacrifice as well as a more elegant and luxurious style of living. For this latter invention, Menes' memory was dishonoured by the Twenty-fourth Dynasty pharaoh Tefnakht and Plutarch mentions a pillar at Thebes on which was inscribed an imprecation against Menes as the introducer of luxury.

In Pliny's account, Menes was credited with being the inventor of writing in Egypt.

Crocodile episode 
Diodorus Siculus recorded a story of Menes related by the priests of the crocodile god Sobek at Crocodilopolis, in which the pharaoh Menes, attacked by his own dogs while out hunting, fled across Lake Moeris on the back of a crocodile and, in thanks, founded the city of Crocodilopolis.

Gaston Maspero (1910), while acknowledging the possibility that traditions relating to other kings may have become mixed up with this story, dismisses the suggestions of some commentators that the story should be transferred to the Twelfth Dynasty pharaoh Amenemhat III and sees no reason to doubt that Diodorus did not correctly record a tradition of Menes. Later, Edwards (1974) states that "the legend, which is obviously filled with anachronisms, is patently devoid of historical value".

Death 
According to Manetho, Menes reigned for either 30, 60 or 62 years and was killed by a hippopotamus.

In popular culture 
Alexander Dow (1735/6–79), a Scottish orientalist and playwright, wrote the tragedy Sethona, set in ancient Egypt. The lead part of Menes is described in the dramatis personæ as "next male-heir to the crown" now worn by Seraphis, and was played by Samuel Reddish in a 1774 production by David Garrick at the Theatre Royal, Drury Lane.

See also 
 First Dynasty of Egypt family tree
 Mannus, ancestral figure in Germanic mythology
 Minos, king of Crete, son of Zeus and Europa
 Manu (Hinduism), Progenitor of humanity
 Nu'u, Hawaiian mythological character who built an ark and escaped a Great Flood
 Nüwa, goddess in Chinese mythology best known for creating mankind
 Min (god)
 Hor-Aha

Notes

References

Bibliography 
 
 .
 
 
 .
 .
 .
 .
 .
 . Available online .
.
 .
.
.
 .
 .
 .
 .
 .
 .
 .

External links 

 .
 .
 .
 

31st-century BC Pharaohs
32nd-century BC Pharaohs
Deaths due to hippopotamus attacks
Egyptian mythology
Hunting accident deaths
People whose existence is disputed
Pharaohs of the First Dynasty of Egypt
Accidental deaths in Egypt

ca:Narmer